Oscar Haza (born December 12, 1951) is a journalist from the Dominican Republic. 

At the age of 22, Haza moved to Miami to pursue his career in journalism. He is host of the Channel 22 news talk show Ahora Con Oscar Haza which airs on Mega TV. The topics of his programming range from current cultural issues and local news to a recurring South Florida topic: Cuba. His audience is composed mostly of Cuban Americans and South Florida Hispanics. His guests are usually the most important people in the current news cycle, including ambassadors, former presidents, governors, political analysts, famous writers, and artists.

Personal life 
On December 21, 2010, Haza had a quadruple bypass operation in Miami.

See also     
Faride Raful
Freddy Ginebra
Geovanny Vicente
Nuria Piera
Miguel Franjul
Pedro Henríquez Ureña
Orlando Martínez Howley
Tony Dandrades

References

Living people
American male journalists
American television personalities
Male television personalities
1954 births
Dominican Republic journalists
Male journalists
White Dominicans